Manor Farm Saints F.C. is a football club based on the Channel Island of Guernsey. They reached the quarter-finals of the Guernsey FA Cup in 2015

References

Football clubs in Guernsey